Gérard Bapt (born 4 February 1946 in Saint-Étienne) is a French politician. He was the deputy for Haute-Garonne's 2nd constituency in the National Assembly of France. He was a member of the Socialist Party (Parti Socialiste) and worked in association with the SRC parliamentary group.

Bapt is a medical doctor and heart specialist. He was first elected in 1978 (to the first constituency) and kept his seat until 1993; he was then re-elected in 1997 and held his seat until 2017.

References

External links
Official website

1946 births
Living people
Politicians from Saint-Étienne
Socialist Party (France) politicians
Deputies of the 12th National Assembly of the French Fifth Republic
Deputies of the 13th National Assembly of the French Fifth Republic
Deputies of the 14th National Assembly of the French Fifth Republic